Sony Records was a record label founded by R&B duo Ike & Tina Turner in 1963. It was not affiliated with Sony Group Corporation.

Ike Turner produced singles by members of the Kings of Rhythm and the Ikettes on Sony Records. Records on the label were distributed by CIRCA distributing firm. CIRCA (Consolidated International Record Company of America) was formed in 1962 to operate as a releasing company for independent labels by working with various distributors around the US.

Discography

See also 

 Sonja Records
 Innis Records
 Teena Records
Prann Records
 List of record labels

References 

American record labels
Rhythm and blues record labels
Pop record labels
Ike Turner
Ike & Tina Turner
Record labels established in 1963
Vanity record labels
Record labels based in California
Defunct record labels of the United States